A terrorist front organization is created to conceal activities or provide logistical or financial support to the illegal activities.

See also
 Hawala, an informal value transfer system useful to terrorists (and criminals) for transmission of money outside of regulated channels.
 List of charities accused of ties to terrorism

Sources 
 Hawala. An Informal Payment System and Its Use to Finance Terrorism by Sebastian R. Müller (Dec. 2006)  

 
Front organizations